Kleve transmitter is a facility for FM and TV transmission (until 1993 also medium wave transmission) of the WDR near Kleve in North Rhine-Westphalia, Germany. The Kleve transmitter was founded in 1953.

This mast replaced the old radio mast from the 1960s which was also used for transmissions in the medium wave range until 1993.

See also
 List of masts

References

External links
 

Radio masts and towers in Germany
1953 establishments in West Germany
Towers completed in 1953
Buildings and structures in Kleve (district)